Won in a Closet is a 1914 black-and-white one-reel comedy film, notable as the first film directed by Mabel Normand.

Preservation status
The film, previously thought to be a lost film, was discovered in 2010 in New Zealand where it was known as Won in a Cupboard.

See also
List of rediscovered films

References

External links
Won in a Closet at IMDB

Films produced by Mack Sennett
1914 films
American silent short films
Films directed by Mabel Normand
1914 comedy films
Silent American comedy films
1914 short films
American black-and-white films
1910s rediscovered films
American comedy short films
1910s English-language films
1910s American films